USS Clifton Sprague (FFG-16) was an  guided missile frigate of the United States Navy, the tenth ship of that class. She was named for Vice Admiral Clifton A. F. Sprague (1896–1955), hero of the Battle off Samar action of the Battle of Leyte Gulf, where he received the Navy Cross. Clifton Sprague (FFG-16) was the first ship of that name in the US Navy. She was transferred to the Turkish Naval Forces in 1997 as TCG Gaziantep (F 490) and remains in active service.

History
Ordered from Bath Iron Works on 27 February 1976 as part of the FY76 program, Clifton Sprague was laid down 30 July 1979, launched 16 February 1980, and commissioned 21 March 1981.

Clifton Sprague was part of the forces during Operation Urgent Fury, the US led 1983 Invasion of Grenada. The frigate served as the clandestine mother ship for a pre-invasion reconnaissance team of Navy SEALs and Air Force combat controllers. Prior to D-Day on 25 Oct., the 20-man commando force twice attempted to use small boats launched from the frigate to reach a new airport under construction on Grenada's southwest coast. Their nighttime attempts to make an assessment of its military defenses and the condition of its uncompleted runway were frustrated both times by rough seas, equipment failures and bad luck.

In July 1993, the guided-missile cruiser  and Clifton Sprague participated in a passing exercise (PASSEX) with three Russian ships, cruiser , destroyer Admiral Kharlamov and the replenishment ship Dnester. This was noteworthy because the two navies had an adversarial relationship for decades prior to the Dissolution of the Soviet Union.

Clifton Sprague was part of the flotilla for Operation Uphold Democracy, the September 1995 US intervention in Haiti.

She was decommissioned on 2 June 1995 at Naval Station Mayport, Florida, and was stricken from the US Navy register on 4 September 1997 after being transferred to Turkey.

TCG Gaziantep (F 490)
She was transferred to Turkey on 27 August 1997 as that nation's TCG Gaziantep (F 490), and then immediately modified into a G-class frigate by the Turkish Naval Yard. As of 2011, she was still in active service.

Awards
Clifton Sprague and her crew received the following unit awards, according to the US Navy unit awards website:
 Navy E Ribbon, 1 October 1980 to 30 September 1981
 Navy E Ribbon, 1 October 1981 to 30 September 1982 
 Navy Expeditionary Medal, 18 April 1983 to 22 April 1983, 1983 United States embassy bombing, Lebanon
 Meritorious Unit Commendation, 23 October 1983 to 2 November 1983, Invasion of Grenada / Operation Urgent Fury
 Armed Forces Expeditionary Medal, 23 October 1983 to 18 November 1983, Invasion of Grenada / Operation Urgent Fury
 Navy E Ribbon 1 October 1983 to 31 March 1985 
 Navy E Ribbon 1 April 1985 to 30 September 1986
 Coast Guard Special Operations Service Ribbon for 1 April 1989
 Coast Guard Special Operations Service Ribbon, 1 July 1989 to 30 September 1989 
 Secretary of the Navy Letter of Commendation, 1 December 1989 to 1 April 1990
 Joint Meritorious Unit Award, 28 January 1991 to 25 February 1991, this was in the Desert Storm time period, but FFG-16 was not listed as participating in the Gulf War.
 Armed Forces Expeditionary Medal, 16 September 1994 to 24 September 1994, Operation Uphold Democracy Haiti
 Meritorious Unit Commendation, 11 September 1994 to 31 March 1995, Operation Uphold Democracy Haiti
 National Defense Service Medal for service during the Gulf War era 
Clifton Sprague was also nominated for the United States Public Health Service Outstanding Unit Citation for operations from 24 June 1994 to 12 July 1994, but did not receive the award. This was around the time that many refugees were fleeing Haiti in small boats.

References

External links

MaritimeQuest USS Clifton Sprague FFG-16 pages

 

Oliver Hazard Perry-class frigates of the United States Navy
1980 ships
Ships transferred from the United States Navy to the Turkish Navy
Ships built in Bath, Maine